Ilya Lazarevich Tsipursky (26 August 1934 – 3 August 2022) was a Soviet judoka and sambist. He participated at the 1964 European Judo Championships, being awarded the silver medal in the amateurs's 80 kg event. He was in the middleweight class.

Tsipursky was considered a champion of the Soviet Union in the martial art sambo in 1956 and 1962. He worked at the Moscow State University of Civil Engineering, where he served as the candidate of engineering and was also the Department of Construction Mechanization professor. He was honored with the Honored Master of Sports of the USSR for his sambo work.

Tsipursky died in August 2022, at the age of 87.

References

External links 
 

1934 births
2022 deaths
Soviet male judoka
Russian male judoka
Russian sambo practitioners
Russian male martial artists
Honoured Masters of Sport of the USSR
Russian engineers
Russian mechanical engineers
Russian materials scientists
20th-century Russian engineers